The 2nd Army Corps was a formation in the Imperial Russian Army that was active during World War I. It was headquartered in Grodno prior to the outbreak of the war, and took part in the Battle of Tannenberg in August 1914.

Composition
26th Infantry Division
43rd Infantry Division
2nd Cavalry Division

Commanders
1907: Kyprian Kandratovich
1912-1914: Sergei Scheidemann
 08.06.1915 — 30.05.1917 : Vasily Flug

See also 
Imperial Russian Army formations and units (1914)

Notes 

Corps of the Russian Empire
Military units and formations established in 1877
Military units and formations disestablished in 1917
1877 establishments in the Russian Empire